James Scott Herndon (born August 30, 1973) is a former American football offensive tackle in the National Football League (NFL). He was selected by the Jacksonville Jaguars in the 5th round (146th overall) of the 1996 NFL Draft. He played collegiately at the University of Houston

He was also a member of the Chicago Bears and Houston Texans.

Jimmy is now the Small Groups Pastor at Second Baptist Church in Baytown, TX.
Second Baptist Baytown

1973 births
Living people
People from Baytown, Texas
Players of American football from Texas
American football offensive tackles
Houston Cougars football players
Jacksonville Jaguars players
Chicago Bears players
Houston Texans players
Sportspeople from Harris County, Texas